The  is a minor nationalist party in Japan that was founded in 1988. , it is not represented in either chamber of the Diet of Japan.

Political ideology

The Japan Nation Party is on the political right. It promotes nationalism and wants Japan to become a "true national power". The party's stated goals are to "enrich people's freedom", show "respect for human rights", and promote "social equilibrium".

Political activities

The party has taken part in Japanese upper house elections since 1992 and in lower house elections since 1993. In 1991, it ran  as its candidate for Governor of Tokyo. Shirai is currently the party president.

References

External links

1988 establishments in Japan
Nationalist parties in Japan
Political parties established in 1988
Political parties in Japan
ja:志良以榮#国民党 (日本 1988 - )